Bongard is an unincorporated community in Champaign County, Illinois, United States. Bongard is northeast of Villa Grove.

References

Unincorporated communities in Champaign County, Illinois
Unincorporated communities in Illinois